The 2016 Pittsburg State Gorillas football team represented Pittsburg State University in the 2016 NCAA Division II football season. The Gorillas played their home games on Brandenburg Field in Carnie Smith Stadium in Pittsburg, Kansas, as they have done since 1923. 2016 was the 109th season in school history. The Gorillas were led by seventh-year head coach, Tim Beck. Pittsburg State has been a member of the Mid-America Intercollegiate Athletics Association since 1989.

Preseason
The Gorillas entered the 2016 season after finishing with a 6–5 record overall and in conference play, under Beck. On August 2, 2016 at the MIAA Football Media Day, the Gorillas were chosen to finish in 3rd place in both the Coaches Poll and in the Media Poll. In the Coaches Poll, Pittsburg State was tied with Emporia State for third.

On August 22, D2football.com released its Top 25 poll, ranking Pittsburg State 24th.

Personnel

Coaching staff
Along with Beck, there were 12 assistants.

Roster

Schedule

Source:

Game summaries

Central Missouri

Central Oklahoma

Northeastern State

Lindenwood

Washburn

Fort Hays State

Missouri Western

Emporia State

Northwest Missouri State

Nebraska–Kearney

Missouri Southern

References

Pittsburg State
Pittsburg State Gorillas football seasons
Pittsburg State Gorillas football